Camp Greyhound is the nickname of a temporary makeshift jail  at the Greyhound Bus station next to the New Orleans Union Passenger Terminal that was operational in the aftermath of Hurricane Katrina of August 29, 2005. With local jails flooded, Camp Greyhound was established to "get the criminals off the streets" (Burl Cain, Warden of Camp Greyhound) prior to reconstruction.

Operation 
The construction of Camp Greyhound by the Louisiana Department of Corrections was one of the top priorities in the rebuilding of New Orleans. Sixteen cages of chain-link fencing and topped with razor wire were erected at the bus stop under the canopies to house up to 700 people. Work was done by prisoners from the Louisiana State Penitentiary at Angola under the direction of Burl Cain. Most suspects had been arrested for looting, others  for curfew violation, vehicle theft, intoxication, or resisting arrest. By September 8, nine inmates had been incarcerated for attempted murder. An outdoor cage could hold about 45 people. There was no furniture and inmates had to sleep on the asphalt ground of the bus station without mattresses and had to use an open portable toilet. Food consisted of military issued meals. The facility was fully lit at night with electric power being generated by an Amtrak engine running 24 hours. Inmates were guarded by officers from the Louisiana State Penitentiary at Angola. At least five mercenary companies were enlisted to round up "prisoners" and keep the jail running. On the Outside, the camp was protected by the National Guard.

The jail had a processing center where inmates were photographed and fingerprinted. The single public defender was not able to offer individual advice; the only option was to plead guilty and agree to community service, or to be sent to a permanent facility and wait a minimum of 21 days for further processing. In the latter case inmates were bussed to permanent facilities.

Apparently the first inmates were placed into the facility on Monday, September 5, 2005.  Clad in prison-orange they were not allowed to notify relatives or lawyers, - no phone calls were permitted. A report by the Washington Times from September 9, 2005 indicated that over 220 people suspected of looting were at Camp Greyhound at that time.

Camp Greyhound operated for about six weeks or two months.

Denial of constitutional rights 
The collapse of the judicial system after the hurricane affected people who were held at Camp Greyhound. About 1,200 people, mostly African-Americans, passed through the jail and regular judicial proceedings were not followed violating habeas corpus rights. By the end of its operation, exaggerated reports of unrest, looting, and violence started to be revised and retracted. Indeed, a small number of NOPD officers were reported to have participated in the looting.

A number of reports emerged indicating innocent people being incarcerated for a prolonged time; first at Camp Greyhound and then transferred to outside prisons. James Terry was arrested for "looting" his own apartment. He spent time at Camp Greyhound then at a permanent jail without ever having had access to a lawyer, being charged with a crime, or having a court hearing before his eventual release seven months later. Pedro Parra –Sanchez went through Camp Greyhound on October 13, 2005 and disappeared in the penal system for 13 months.  Abdulrahman Zeitoun's Kafkaesque case was documented in the eponymous book by David Eggers. He was released after one month, while his companions were held  five, six, and eight months more, - all without due process. Another inmate, Ashton O'Dwyer, an attorney, claimed that he was pepper-sprayed and shot with beanbag rounds while in custody. He was never charged with a crime and his lawsuit regarding his incarceration was unsuccessful. In contrast, a jury later awarded $650,000 to two tourists who had been caught in the system.

In 2009, Dan Berger argued that journalistic routines and uncritical reporting by the media "legitimated punishment as disaster policy" and "suggested militarized policing and imprisonment as fundamental to restore order".  In 2011, James Fox  from the New Statesman opined that Camp Greyhound was "known for organized brutality, a little-known, near-exact facsimile of Guantanamo Bay".

References 

New Orleans
2005 in Louisiana
Hurricane
Parish jails in Louisiana